Zeyvə is a village and municipality in the Ismailli Rayon of Azerbaijan.  It has a population of 1,003.  The municipality consists of the villages of Zeyvə, Xankəndi, and Kürdüvan.

References 

Populated places in Ismayilli District